Incident Light is a 2015 Argentine drama film directed by Ariel Rotter. It was screened in the Contemporary World Cinema section of the 2015 Toronto International Film Festival.

Cast
 Érica Rivas
 Susana Pampin
 Marcelo Subiotto

References

External links
 

2015 films
2015 drama films
Argentine drama films
Uruguayan drama films
French drama films
Argentine black-and-white films
Uruguayan black-and-white films
French black-and-white films
2010s Spanish-language films
2010s Argentine films
2010s French films